Jean-Marie David (born 13 January 1982 in Rennes) is a French professional footballer. He currently plays in the Championnat National for USJA Carquefou.

David played at the club level in Ligue 2 for FC Lorient.

1982 births
Living people
French footballers
Ligue 2 players
Championnat National players
FC Lorient players
Paris FC players
FC Gueugnon players
FC Rouen players
USJA Carquefou players
Stade Rennais F.C. players
AS Vitré players
US Saint-Malo players
Footballers from Rennes
Association football midfielders